Robert Davies (1685/86 – 22 May 1728) was a Welsh antiquary and son of fellow antiquary, Robert Davies.

Early life and education
Davies was born on 1685/6 as the son of Robert Davies of Llannerch and his wife, Letitia (née Vaughan). Davies matriculated from Brasenose College, Oxford University on 27 June 1702, aged 16. His father died on 8 July 1710, with his Llannerch and Gwysaney estates passed on to Davies. Davies became High Sheriff of Flintshire.

Personal life and death
Davies married Anne, daughter of John Brockholes of Claughton, Lancaster. Two portraits exist of Davies in Gwysaney. He died on 22 May 1728.

After his death, a notable effigy of him was constructed by Henry Cheere in St Mary's Church, Mold. The full-length effigy shows Davies in Roman clothing, described as "superb" by Thompson Cooper, a writer for the Dictionary of National Biography.  Davies' son, Robert Davies (1710–1763), was a scholarly patron, like his grandfather. He was a warm friend of the Welsh poet Evan Evans, who composed an elegy for Davies III. Davies' grandson, Peter Davies, never married. He died without a will in 1785, and the family's estate and library were divided and inherited by his two sisters.

References

Further reading
 

1728 deaths
18th-century antiquarians
Alumni of Brasenose College, Oxford
Welsh antiquarians